Mount Oates is a mountain ocated North of the Hooker Icefield, on the border of Alberta and British Columbia. It was named in 1913 by G.E. Howard for Captain Lawrence Oates a member of the ill-fated 1910-13 Terra Nova Expedition under command of Captain Robert F. Scott.

See also
 List of peaks on the British Columbia–Alberta border
 List of mountains in the Canadian Rockies

References

Three-thousanders of Alberta
Three-thousanders of British Columbia
Mountains of Jasper National Park
Canadian Rockies